Susan O'Neill,  (born 2 August 1973) is an Australian former competitive swimmer from Brisbane, Queensland, nicknamed "Madame Butterfly". She achieved eight Olympic Games medals during her swimming career.

Early life
Susan (Susie) O'Neill was born on 2 August 1973 in Mackay, Queensland, to Trish and John O'Neill.  She has two siblings, a brother and a sister. Her family moved to Brisbane and she was educated at Lourdes Hill College (LHC) in Hawthorne. Whilst at LHC, O'Neill excelled in sport, setting school records in 50 m and 100 m butterfly, freestyle, and backstroke. She was also LHC cross country champion and set records for the 13 years 800 m in 1986 and for the 15 years 400 m in 1988 for athletics. All these records still stood as of 2011.

Swimming career

O'Neill won the 200m butterfly at the 1996 Summer Olympics and the 200m freestyle at the 2000 Summer Olympics. She has won 35 Australian titles, 8 Olympic medals including 2 gold, and 24 gold medals in major international competitions. Only Emma McKeon, Ian Thorpe and Leisel Jones have won more Olympic medals for Australia.

At her international debut at the 1990 Commonwealth Games, she won two medals (gold and silver), and continued to add to her medals cache at every international competition until her final Olympics. In front of a home crowd at the 2000 Olympic Games Trials she broke the 19-year standing world record of another "Madame Butterfly", Mary T. Meagher, in the 200m butterfly, but was beaten in an upset at the 2000 Olympic Games by American Misty Hyman.

She trained under Bernie Wakefield until 1994, then Scott Volkers at the Commercial Swimming Club in Brisbane.

Post swimming career
O'Neill is an ambassador for the Fred Hollows Foundation.

She provided commentary at the 2006 Commonwealth Games in Melbourne for the Australian Broadcasting Corporation. She was the Oceania athletes' representative on the International Olympic Committee from 2000 to 2005. When she resigned her membership she was replaced by Barbara Kendall.

On 10 March 2007 during the 12th FINA World Championship, O'Neill was honoured by the dedication of the temporary swimming pool in the Rod Laver Arena in Melbourne named after her for the duration of the competition.

O'Neill is a co-host on Nova 106.9's breakfast radio show Ash, Luttsy & Susie.

On 14 February 2018, O'Neill released a single entitled "My Heart Goes Boom".

In May 2019, O'Neill was announced as Australia's joint Deputy Chef de Mission for the 2020 Olympic Games in Tokyo, with fellow Olympians, Evelyn Halls and Kim Brennan.

Honours and awards

 1996 – awarded the World Trophy for Australasia.
 1996 – joint winner with Jackie Gallagher of the Australian Sport Awards Female Athlete of the Year
 1997 – Australian Day Honours, O'Neill was awarded the Order of Australia Medal "for service to sport as a gold medallist at the Atlanta Olympic Games, 1996."
 1998 – awarded the Australian Sport Awards Female Athlete of the Year
 1998 – was named Favourite Female Sports Star at the 1998 and the 1999 Australian People's Choice Awards.
 14 July 2000 – awarded the Australian Sports Medal for "her significant contribution as a competitor in swimming".
 2000 – the State Transit Authority named a SuperCat ferry after O'Neill.
 2000 – At the 2000 Sydney Olympics, she was elected to the International Olympic Committee Athletes' Commission by competitors at the 2000 Games, but family obligations caused her to resign in 2005. 
 1 January 2001 – awarded the Centenary Medal "For service to the community through health". 
 5 December 2002 –  inducted into Sport Australia Hall of Fame. 
 2009 – inducted into the Queensland Sport Hall of Fame.
 In 2009 as part of the Q150 celebrations, O'Neill was announced as one of the Q150 Icons of Queensland for her role as a "sports legend".
 2012 – elevated to become Sport Australia Hall of Fame's 34th Legend of Australian Sport.
 2018 – appointed Member of the Order of Australia in Australia Day Honours "For significant service to swimming at the elite level, as a mentor and role model, and to the community through support for charitable organisations."

Personal life
O'Neill married Cliff Fairley, who works as an ophthalmologist, in 1998. They have two children.

See also
 List of members of the International Swimming Hall of Fame
 List of Olympic medalists in swimming (women)
 List of multiple Summer Olympic medalists
 List of World Aquatics Championships medalists in swimming (women)
 List of Commonwealth Games medallists in swimming (women)
 World record progression 200 metres butterfly

Philanthropy  
O'Neil and her husband, Cliff Fairley, help generously to raise awareness for the Fred Hollows Foundation, and are  one of its most distinguished ambassadors. The Fred Hollows Foundation is an international nonprofit organization that educates surgeons on how to cure avoidable blindness within underserved communities and countries.

References

External links
 
 
 Olympic Swimmer Susie O'Neill – ABC Queensland (Australian Broadcasting Corporation website)
 Susie O'Neill – Elite Sports Properties
 
 

1973 births
Living people
Australian Swimmers of the Year
Commercial Swimming Club swimmers
Commonwealth Games gold medallists for Australia
Commonwealth Games silver medallists for Australia
Australian female freestyle swimmers
Australian female butterfly swimmers
World record setters in swimming
Medalists at the FINA World Swimming Championships (25 m)
Australian International Olympic Committee members
Olympic bronze medalists for Australia
Olympic gold medalists for Australia
Olympic bronze medalists in swimming
Olympic silver medalists for Australia
Olympic swimmers of Australia
People educated at Lourdes Hill College
Recipients of the Australian Sports Medal
Recipients of the Centenary Medal
Recipients of the Medal of the Order of Australia
Sport Australia Hall of Fame inductees
Sportswomen from Queensland
Swimmers at the 1990 Commonwealth Games
Swimmers at the 1992 Summer Olympics
Swimmers at the 1996 Summer Olympics
Swimmers at the 1994 Commonwealth Games
Swimmers at the 1998 Commonwealth Games
Swimmers at the 2000 Summer Olympics
World Aquatics Championships medalists in swimming
Swimmers from Brisbane
Medalists at the 2000 Summer Olympics
Medalists at the 1996 Summer Olympics
Medalists at the 1992 Summer Olympics
Olympic gold medalists in swimming
Olympic silver medalists in swimming
International Olympic Committee members
Commonwealth Games medallists in swimming
Members of the Order of Australia
20th-century Australian women
Medallists at the 1990 Commonwealth Games
Medallists at the 1994 Commonwealth Games
Medallists at the 1998 Commonwealth Games